Shekulli is a daily newspaper published in Albania. The paper is owned by the media group UNIPRESS sh.p.k  Its headquarters is located in Tirana, Albania.

See also
 List of newspapers in Albania
 News in Albania

References

External links
Official website 

1997 establishments in Albania
Newspapers established in 1997
Newspapers published in Albania
Mass media in Tirana
Albanian-language newspapers